Yang Fuyu (30 October 1927 – 5 January 2023) was a Chinese biochemist, biophysicist and writer. He was the main founder of biomembrane study in China. He served as chief of the National Laboratory of Biomacromolecules, Institute of Biophysics, Chinese Academy of Sciences.

Life
Yang was a native of Ningbo, Zhejiang, and was born in Shanghai in 1927. He graduated from the Department of Chemistry, Zhejiang University in 1950. Just after his graduation, he worked for the Institute of Experimental Biology, Chinese Academy of Sciences (CAS) as an assistant.

In 1956, Yang went to USSR and studied at the Department of Biology, Moscow State University until 1960 when he received a PhD there.

Yang was a long-serving senior scientist at the Institute of Biophysics, Chinese Academy of Sciences. He was also a professor of the institute, a professor of the Graduate School, University of Science and Technology of China and a professor at Wuhan University.

Yang died on 5 January 2023 in Beijing, at the age of 95.

Academic positions
 Academician, Chinese Academy of Sciences (elected 1991)
 General secretary (1993–1997), Chinese Biochemical Society
 Vice-president (1982–1984, 1993–1997), Chinese Biochemical Society
 Editor-in-chief, Acta Biophysica Sinica

Family
Yang's younger brother was the nuclear physicist Yang Fujia.

References

 ChinaVitae - YANG Fuyu 
 The Holeung Ho Lee Foundation: AWARDEE OF LIFE SCIENCES PRIZE - YANG FUYU 
 YANG Fuyu - the Father of Chinese Membrane Biology  

1927 births
2023 deaths
Biologists from Shanghai
Chemists from Shanghai
Educators from Shanghai
Members of the Chinese Academy of Sciences
Moscow State University alumni
People's Republic of China science writers
Physicists from Shanghai
Writers from Shanghai
Academic staff of Wuhan University
Nanyang Model High School alumni
University of Science and Technology of China alumni
Zhejiang University alumni
Chinese expatriates in the Soviet Union